John Heche is a Tanzanian politician. He serves as a member of the Parliament of Tanzania.

References

Living people
St. Augustine University of Tanzania alumni
Members of the National Assembly (Tanzania)
Year of birth missing (living people)